Bukayo is a Filipino dessert made from sweetened coconut strips. It is traditionally made by simmering strips or shredded bits of young, gelatinous coconut (buko) in water and sinuklob, which is sugarcane muscovado sugar melted into a chewy caramel-like consistency. Dryer versions of bukayo with a crumbly texture are known as bocarillo. Bukayo can be eaten on its own, usually rolled into little balls. But they can also be used as garnishing and fillings for other desserts, most notably for pan de coco and sinudlan empanada.

Bukayo is also spelled as bucaio, bucayo, bokayo, bukhayo, or bukayu. During the Spanish rule of the Philippines, it was known as conserva de coco ("coconut preserve") in Spanish. It is also known as hinti' in Tausug.

Peanut brittle in the Philippines is also sometimes locally known as bukayo mani''.

See also
Daral (food)

References

External links
Bukayo

Philippine desserts
Foods containing coconut